Christie Malry's Own Double Entry by Luke Haines is the soundtrack to the film of the same name, based on a novel by B. S. Johnson and directed by Paul Tickell. The album includes a cover of the Nick Lowe song "I Love the Sound of Breaking Glass" from Lowe's Jesus of Cool album.

Track listing
 "Discomania"  – 3:06
 "In the Bleak Midwinter"  – 3:28
 "How to Hate the Working Classes"  – 3:35
 "The Ledger"  – 2:17
 "Bernie's Funeral/Auto Asphixiation"  – 2:18
 "Discomaniax"  – 4:31
 "Alchemy"  – 2:28
 "Art Will Save the World"  – 1:58
 "I Love the Sound of Breaking Glass" (Nick Lowe/Andrew Bodnar/Steve Goulding) – 7:03
 "England Scotland and Wales"  – 3:30
 "Celestial Discomania"  – 4:26
 "Essexmania"  – 6:56

Personnel 
James Banbury – Cello, Programming
Luke Haines – Vocals, Multi Instruments, Producer
Pete Hofmann – Producer, Engineer, Mixing
Tim Weller – Drums
Winchester Cathedral Choir – Performer

References 

Luke Haines albums
2001 soundtrack albums
Film soundtracks
Hut Records albums